Nikul C. Desai is an Indian television director, known for directing shows such as Rising Star, Comedy Circus, Comedy Nights Bachao and Entertainment Ki Raat. He is also the creative producer and nonfiction content head at Optimystix Entertainment.

Early life and career 
Nikul was born into a Gujarati Jain family. He started off his career as an assistant director at Optimystix Entertainment in 2001.

In 2006, Nikul was working as an associate director in a television series. He received his first break as a full-time television director when the existing director of a show fell ill.

Nikul shot to fame after directing Comedy Circus, that ran for eighteen seasons between 2007 and 2018 on Sony Entertainment Television. He is credited for having introduced comedians like Kapil Sharma, Krushna Abhishek, Bharti Singh, and Sudesh Lehri to audiences.

His recent show as a director, Taare Zameen Par, was a kid singing reality show that aired on StarPlus. The series was hosted by the child actress Aakriti Sharma and singer Sugandha Mishra with Shankar Mahadevan, Jonita Gandhi and Tony Kakkar as the mentors. Nikul is currently directing the ongoing daily nonfiction show on Sab TV titled – Good Night India.

Television

Awards 

 2018: Indian Television Academy Awards

References

External links 

 

Living people
Indian television directors
Year of birth missing (living people)